The Birdie Boussuet Farm, near Richfield, Idaho, was listed on the National Register of Historic Places in 1983.

It also includes a barn. The buildings "are significant as examples of rural vernacular architecture demonstrating the hard work and resourcefulness of a Lincoln county farmer-mason," Birdie Bousset. It was owned by him from about 1921 to 1927.

References

National Register of Historic Places in Lincoln County, Idaho
Buildings and structures completed in 1921